Stanislav Rumenov (born 11 February 1980) is a Bulgarian former footballer who played as a forward.

References

Bulgarian footballers
1980 births
First Professional Football League (Bulgaria) players
Second Professional Football League (Bulgaria) players
OFC Pirin Blagoevgrad players
PFC CSKA Sofia players
PFC Cherno More Varna players
FC Lokomotiv 1929 Sofia players
PFC Minyor Pernik players
Association football forwards
Living people